Lutumba is a surname. Notable people with the surname include:

Joseph Lutumba, Congolese lyricist
Simaro Lutumba (1938–2019), Congolese soukous rhythm guitarist, songwriter and bandleader